Angelo Pizzetti (born October 10, 1963) is a retired Italian professional football player.

1963 births
Living people
Italian footballers
Serie A players
U.S. Sassuolo Calcio players
Inter Milan players
Ternana Calcio players
Modena F.C. players
Ravenna F.C. players
Association football goalkeepers